JWH-184 is a synthetic cannabinoid receptor ligand from the naphthylmethylindole family. It is the carbonyl-reduced derivative of related compound JWH-122. The binding affinity of JWH-184 for the CB1 receptor is reported as Ki = 23 ± 6 nM.

In the United States, all CB1 receptor agonists of the 3-(1-naphthylmethane)indole class such as JWH-184 are Schedule I Controlled Substances.

See also 

 JWH-018
 JWH-122
 JWH-185

References 

JWH cannabinoids
CB1 receptor agonists
Naphthalenes
Indoles